Glamourcon was a fan convention that took place twice a year, once in Chicago and once in Los Angeles, that centers upon glamour models and glamour photography, with its guests typically being Playboy Playmates, Penthouse Pets, Hustler Honeys, Perfect 10 Models, soft core pornographic actresses and other pin-up models. A portmanteau of the phrase "glamour convention", it was founded by entrepreneur Robert Schulz.

External links

"Glamourcon 44 Chicago". Unrated Magazine. Chicago. August 2008.

Defunct multigenre conventions
Defunct fan conventions